Chinese Taipei competed at the 2020 Summer Paralympics in Tokyo, Japan, from 24 August to 5 September 2021.

Medalists

Competitors
The following is the list of number of competitors participating in the Games:

Athletics 

Three athletes from Chinese Taipei have qualified to compete at the Games.

Badminton 

Chinese Taipei entered one badminton player in the following event at the Games. This will be the first time that para badminton is included in the Games. Each event starts with a round-robin group play stage, with the top two players (teams) advancing to the quarterfinals or semifinals, depending on the total number of players (teams) in the event.

Judo 

Having won the silver medal at the 2012 Summer Paralympics, Lee Kai-lin was qualified to compete in the women's 48 kg weight class for a third consecutive time by virtue of her IBSF world ranking as of June 2021.

Powerlifting

Lin Ya-hsuan will compete in the Paralympics for the fifth consecutive time. The best outcome out of three attempts counted as the final results. The athlete who placed first in each event was allowed a fourth attempt to break the Paralympic or world record.

Swimming

Men

Table tennis 

Four Taiwanese table tennis players successfully got a slot through the World Ranking Allocation.
Men

Women

See also 
Chinese Taipei at the Paralympics
Chinese Taipei at the 2020 Summer Olympics

References 

Nations at the 2020 Summer Paralympics
2020